Stare Koprzywno  is a former village in the administrative district of Gmina Barwice, within Szczecinek County, West Pomeranian Voivodeship, in north-western Poland.

Before 1945 the area was part of Germany. The old village site is the current site of the village of Luboradza, as seen on 1893 map.  For the history of the region, see History of Pomerania.

References

Stare Koprzywno